The 2021–22 Brooklyn Nets season was the 46th season of the franchise in the National Basketball Association (NBA), 55th season overall, and its 10th season playing in the New York City borough of Brooklyn. On April 2, 2022, the Nets clinched a spot in the play-in tournament. On April 12, the Nets clinched a playoff spot after winning the play-in game against the Cleveland Cavaliers. In the first round of the 2022 NBA playoffs, they faced the Boston Celtics, losing the series 4–0. It was the second time in three seasons that the Nets were swept in the first round of the playoffs; in the 2020 playoffs, they were swept by the Toronto Raptors.

Draft

The Nets entered the draft holding one first round pick and three second round picks. The 44th overall pick was acquired on July 7, 2016, in a trade with the Indiana Pacers. The 49th overall pick was acquired on July 6, 2019, in a trade with the Atlanta Hawks. The 59th overall pick was acquired on July 20, 2018, in a trade with the Phoenix Suns. The Nets used their 27th overall pick to select Cam Thomas, and then selected Kessler Edwards (44th overall pick), Marcus Zegarowski (49th overall pick) and RaiQuan Gray (59th overall pick).

Roster

Standings

Division

Conference

Game log

Preseason
The preseason schedule was announced on August 10, 2021.

|- style="background:#bfb;"
| 1
| October 3
| @ L.A. Lakers
| 
| Thomas (21)
| Millsap (10)
| Aldridge, Millsap (3)
| Staples Center16,000
| 1–0
|- style="background:#bfb;"
| 2
| October 8
| Milwaukee
| 
| Durant (18)
| Durant (6)
| Griffin (5)
| Barclays Center12,770
| 2–0
|- style="background:#fbb;"
| 3
| October 11
| @ Philadelphia
| 
| Durant (23)
| Durant (7)
| Harden (4)
| Wells Fargo Center14,522
| 2–1
|- style="background:#bfb;"
| 4
| October 14
| Minnesota
| 
| Harris (23)
| Millsap (9)
| Harden (14)
| Barclays Center11,210
| 3–1

Regular season
The regular season schedule was released on August 20, 2021.

|- style="background:#fbb;"
| 1
| October 19
| @ Milwaukee
| 
| Durant (32)
| Durant (11)
| Harden (8)
| Fiserv Forum17,341
| 0–1
|- style="background:#bfb;"
| 2
| October 22
| @ Philadelphia
| 
| Durant (29)
| Durant (15)
| Durant (12)
| Wells Fargo Center20,367
| 1–1
|- style="background:#fbb;"
| 3
| October 24
| Charlotte
| 
| Durant (38)
| Aldridge (8)
| Harden (8)
| Barclays Center17,732
| 1–2
|- style="background:#bfb;"
| 4
| October 25
| Washington
| 
| Durant (25)
| Griffin (9)
| Harden (9)
| Barclays Center14,487
| 2–2
|- style="background:#fbb;"
| 5
| October 27
| Miami
| 
| Durant (25)
| Durant (11)
| Harden (7)
| Barclays Center17,732
| 2–3
|- style="background:#bfb;"
| 6
| October 29
| Indiana
| 
| Harden (29)
| Durant (11)
| Harden (8)
| Barclays Center16,139
| 3–3
|- style="background:#bfb;"
| 7
| October 31
| Detroit
| 
| Durant (23)
| Harden (10)
| Harden (12)
| Barclays Center13,507
| 4–3

|- style="background:#bfb;"
| 8
| November 3
| Atlanta
| 
| Durant (32)
| Durant, Griffin (7)
| Harden (11)
| Barclays Center17,323
| 5–3
|- style="background:#bfb;"
| 9
| November 5
| @ Detroit
| 
| Durant (29)
| Durant, Harden (10)
| Harden (10)
| Little Caesars Arena14,235
| 6–3
|- style="background:#bfb;"
| 10
| November 7
| @ Toronto
| 
| Durant (31)
| Griffin (11)
| Harden (8)
| Scotiabank Arena19,800
| 7–3
|- style="background:#fbb;"
| 11
| November 8
| @ Chicago
| 
| Durant (38)
| Durant (11)
| Harden (5)
| United Center19,459
| 7–4
|- style="background:#bfb;"
| 12
| November 10
| @ Orlando
| 
| Durant (30)
| Harden (11)
| Harden (11)
| Amway Center13,882
| 8–4
|- style="background:#bfb;"
| 13
| November 12
| @ New Orleans
| 
| Harden (39)
| Durant (7)
| Harden (12)
| Smoothie King Center14,650
| 9–4
|- style="background:#bfb;"
| 14
| November 14
| @ Oklahoma City
| 
| Durant (33)
| Aldridge, Durant (8)
| Harden (13)
| Paycom Center15,080
| 10–4
|- style="background:#fbb;"
| 15
| November 16
| Golden State
| 
| Harden (24)
| Sharpe (7)
| Harden, Mills (4)
| Barclays Center17,732
| 10–5
|- style="background:#bfb;"
| 16
| November 17
| Cleveland
| 
| Harden (27)
| Brown, Harden (10)
| Harden (7)
| Barclays Center16,922
| 11–5
|- style="background:#bfb;"
| 17
| November 19
| Orlando
| 
| Harden (36)
| Harden, Johnson (10)
| Harden (8)
| Barclays Center16,966
| 12–5
|- style="background:#bfb;"
| 18
| November 22
| @ Cleveland
| 
| Durant (27)
| Aldridge (11)
| Harden (14)
| Rocket Mortgage FieldHouse17,387
| 13–5
|- style="background:#bfb;"
| 19
| November 24
| @ Boston
| 
| Mills (23)
| Bembry (10)
| Harden (11)
| TD Garden19,156
| 14–5
|- style="background:#fbb;"
| 20
| November 27
| Phoenix
| 
| Durant (39)
| Harden (13)
| Harden (14)
| Barclays Center18,071
| 14–6
|- style="background:#bfb;"
| 21
| November 30
| New York
| 
| Harden (34)
| Harden (10)
| Durant (9)
| Barclays Center18,081
| 15–6

|- style="background:#bfb;"
| 22
| December 3
| Minnesota
| 
| Durant (30)
| Durant (10)
| Harden (9)
| Barclays Center17,732
| 16–6
|- style="background:#fbb;"
| 23
| December 4
| Chicago
| 
| Durant (28)
| Brown (12)
| Harden (14)
| Barclays Center18,116
| 16–7
|- style="background:#bfb;"
| 24
| December 7
| @ Dallas
| 
| Durant (24)
| Claxton, Harden (9)
| Harden (12)
| American Airlines Center19,559
| 17–7
|- style="background:#fbb;"
| 25
| December 8
| @ Houston
| 
| Harden (25)
| Harden (11)
| Harden (8)
| Toyota Center15,834
| 17–8
|- style="background:#bfb;"
| 26
| December 10
| @ Atlanta
| 
| Durant (31)
| Johnson (8)
| Harden (11)
| State Farm Arena17,074
| 18–8
|- style="background:#bfb;"
| 27
| December 12
| @ Detroit
| 
| Durant (51)
| Durant (7)
| Durant (9)
| Little Caesars Arena15,289
| 19–8
|- style="background:#bfb;"
| 28
| December 14
| Toronto
| 
| Durant (34)
| Duke Jr., Durant (13)
| Durant (11)
| Barclays Center17,325
| 20–8
|- style="background:#bfb;"
| 29
| December 16
| Philadelphia
| 
| Durant (34)
| Durant (11)
| Durant (8)
| Barclays Center17,053
| 21–8
|- style="background:#fbb;"
| 30
| December 18
| Orlando
| 
| Mills (23)
| Duke Jr. (14)
| Griffin (6)
| Barclays Center16,292
| 21–9
|- style="background:#bbb;"
| —
| December 19
| Denver
| —
| colspan="3"|Postponed due to COVID-19 pandemic; moved to January 26
| Barclays Center
| —
|- style="background:#bbb;"
| —
| December 21
| Washington
| —
| colspan="3"|Postponed due to COVID-19 pandemic; moved to February 17
| Barclays Center
| —
|- style="background:#bbb;"
| —
| December 23
| @ Portland
| —
| colspan="3"|Postponed due to COVID-19 pandemic; moved to January 10
| Moda Center
| —
|- style="background:#bfb;"
| 31
| December 25
| @ L.A. Lakers
| 
| Harden (36)
| Harden (10)
| Harden (10)
| Crypto.com Arena18,997
| 22–9
|- style="background:#bfb;"
| 32
| December 27
| @ L.A. Clippers
| 
| Harden (39)
| Griffin (9)
| Harden (15)
| Crypto.com Arena17,128
| 23–9
|- style="background:#fbb;"
| 33
| December 30
| Philadelphia
| 
| Durant, Harden (33)
| Harden (14)
| Harden (10)
| Barclays Center17,920
| 23–10

|- style="background:#fbb;"
| 34
| January 1
| L.A. Clippers
| 
| Harden (34)
| Harden (12)
| Harden (13)
| Barclays Center17,732
| 23–11
|- style="background:#fbb;"
| 35
| January 3
| Memphis
| 
| Durant (26)
| Brown (7)
| Harden (8)
| Barclays Center17,089
| 23–12
|- style="background:#bfb;"
| 36
| January 5
| @ Indiana
| 
| Durant (39)
| Durant (8)
| Durant (7)
| Bankers Life Fieldhouse14,176
| 24–12
|- style="background:#fbb;"
| 37
| January 7
| Milwaukee
| 
| Durant (29)
| Durant (8)
| Durant, Harden (7)
| Barclays Center17,732
| 24–13
|- style="background:#bfb;"
| 38
| January 9
| San Antonio
| 
| Durant (28)
| Claxton (14)
| Harden (12)
| Barclays Center15,606
| 25–13
|- style="background:#fbb;"
| 39
| January 10
| @ Portland
| 
| Durant (28)
| Durant (10)
| Durant, Mills (5)
| Moda Center16,379
| 25–14
|- style="background:#bfb;"
| 40
| January 12
| @ Chicago
| 
| Durant (27)
| Harden, Sharpe (7)
| Harden (16)
| United Center21,698
| 26–14
|- style="background:#fbb;"
| 41
| January 13
| Oklahoma City
| 
| Harden (26)
| Millsap (10)
| Harden (9)
| Barclays Center16,964
| 26–15
|- style="background:#bfb;"
| 42
| January 15
| New Orleans
| 
| Harden (27)
| Sharpe (10)
| Harden (15)
| Barclays Center17,034
| 27–15
|- style="background:#fbb;"
| 43
| January 17
| @ Cleveland
| 
| Irving (27)
| Harden, Irving (7)
| Harden (10)
| Rocket Mortgage FieldHouse18,105
| 27–16
|- style="background:#bfb;"
| 44
| January 19
| @ Washington
| 
| Irving (30)
| Harden (8)
| Harden (9)
| Capital One Arena15,380
| 28–16
|- style="background:#bfb;"
| 45
| January 21
| @ San Antonio
| 
| Harden (37)
| Harden, Sharpe (10)
| Harden (11)
| AT&T Center15,068
| 29–16
|- style="background:#fbb;"
| 46
| January 23
| @ Minnesota
| 
| Irving (30)
| Sharpe (9)
| Harden (13)
| Target Center16,475
| 29–17
|- style="background:#fbb;"
| 47
| January 25
| L.A. Lakers
| 
| Harden (33)
| Harden (12)
| Harden (11)
| Barclays Center18,126
| 29–18
|- style="background:#fbb;"
| 48
| January 26
| Denver
| 
| Thomas (25)
| Aldridge, Johnson (8)
| Johnson (7)
| Barclays Center18,011
| 29–19
|- style="background:#fbb;"
| 49
| January 29
| @ Golden State
| 
| Irving (32)
| Claxton (8)
| Irving (7)
| Chase Center18,064
| 29–20

|- style="background:#fbb;"
| 50
| February 1
| @ Phoenix
| 
| Irving (26)
| Griffin (6)
| Harden (10)
| Footprint Center17,071
| 29–21
|- style="background:#fbb;"
| 51
| February 2
| @ Sacramento
| 
| Claxton (23)
| Claxton (11)
| Harden (12)
| Golden 1 Center13,153
| 29–22
|- style="background:#fbb;"
| 52
| February 4
| @ Utah
| 
| Thomas (30)
| Sharpe (8)
| Irving (6)
| Vivint Arena18,306
| 29–23
|- style="background:#fbb;"
| 53
| February 6
| @ Denver
| 
| Irving (27)
| Edwards (6)
| Irving (11)
| Ball Arena18,241
| 29–24
|- style="background:#fbb;"
| 54
| February 8
| Boston
| 
| Carter (21)
| Sharpe (9)
| Johnson (5)
| Barclays Center17,732
| 29–25
|- style="background:#fbb;"
| 55
| February 10
| @ Washington
| 
| Irving (31)
| Sharpe (10)
| Irving (6)
| Capital One Arena15,204
| 29–26
|- style="background:#fbb;"
| 56
| February 12
| @ Miami
| 
| Irving (29)
| Sharpe (12)
| Irving (5)
| FTX Arena19,600
| 29–27
|- style="background:#bfb;"
| 57
| February 14
| Sacramento
| 
| Curry (23)
| Drummond (9)
| Brown (6)
| Barclays Center16,873
| 30–27
|- style="background:#bfb;"
| 58
| February 16
| @ New York
| 
| Thomas (21)
| Drummond (19)
| Curry (6)
| Madison Square Garden18,916
| 31–27
|- style="background:#fbb;"
| 59
| February 17
| Washington
| 
| Mills (22)
| Drummond (9)
| Brown, Curry (4)
| Barclays Center17,477
| 31–28
|- style="background:#fbb;"
| 60
| February 24
| Boston
| 
| Curry (22)
| Brown, Curry (7)
| Johnson (6)
| Barclays Center17,986
| 31–29
|- style="background:#bfb;"
| 61
| February 26
| @ Milwaukee
| 
| Irving (38)
| Drummond (12)
| Drummond, Irving (5)
| Fiserv Forum17,341
| 32–29
|- style="background:#fbb;"
| 62
| February 28
| Toronto
| 
| Aldridge (15)
| Sharpe (7)
| Dragić (5)
| Barclays Center17,112
| 32–30

|- style="background:#fbb;"
| 63
| March 1
| @ Toronto
| 
| Johnson (19)
| Aldridge (9)
| Curry (6)
| Scotiabank Arena18,903
| 32–31
|- style="background:#fbb;"
| 64
| March 3
| Miami
| 
| Durant (31)
| Aldridge, Brown, Durant, Thomas (4)
| Dragić (7)
| Barclays Center17,732
| 32–32
|- style="background:#fbb;"
| 65
| March 6
| @ Boston
| 
| Durant (37)
| Drummond (7)
| Durant (8)
| TD Garden19,156
| 32–33
|- style="background:#bfb;"
| 66
| March 8
| @ Charlotte
| 
| Irving (50)
| Drummond (14)
| Dragić, Durant (7)
| Spectrum Center17,230
| 33–33
|- style="background:#bfb;"
| 67
| March 10
| @ Philadelphia
| 
| Durant (25)
| Durant (14)
| Dragić, Durant (7)
| Wells Fargo Center21,408
| 34–33
|- style="background:#bfb;"
| 68
| March 13
| New York
| 
| Durant (53)
| Drummond (10)
| Durant (9)
| Barclays Center18,057
| 35–33
|- style="background:#bfb;"
| 69
| March 15
| @ Orlando
| 
| Irving (60)
| Claxton (10)
| Brown (8)
| Amway Center15,282
| 36–33
|- style="background:#fbb;"
| 70
| March 16
| Dallas
| 
| Durant (23)
| Drummond (17)
| Durant (10)
| Barclays Center17,981
| 36–34
|- style="background:#bfb;"
| 71
| March 18
| Portland
| 
| Durant (38)
| Claxton, Drummond (9)
| Dragić (10)
| Barclays Center17,732
| 37–34
|- style="background:#bfb;"
| 72
| March 21
| Utah
| 
| Durant (37)
| Durant (9)
| Durant (8)
| Barclays Center17,887
| 38–34
|- style="background:#fbb;"
| 73
| March 23
| @ Memphis
| 
| Irving (43)
| Durant (11)
| Durant, Irving (8)
| FedExForum17,794
| 38–35
|- style="background:#bfb;"
| 74
| March 26
| @ Miami
| 
| Durant (23)
| Drummond (11)
| Irving (6)
| FTX Arena19,600
| 39–35
|- style="background:#fbb;"
| 75
| March 27
| Charlotte
| 
| Durant (27)
| Drummond (17)
| Irving (11)
| Barclays Center18,166
| 39–36
|- style="background:#bfb;"
| 76
| March 29
| Detroit
| 
| Durant (41)
| Drummond (13)
| Durant (5)
| Barclays Center17,559
| 40–36
|- style="background:#fbb;"
| 77
| March 31
| Milwaukee
| 
| Durant (26)
| Drummond (10)
| Durant (11)
| Barclays Center17,917
| 40–37

|- style="background:#fbb;"
| 78
| April 2
| @ Atlanta
| 
| Durant (55)
| Drummond (13)
| Irving (6)
| State Farm Arena18,126
| 40–38
|- style="background:#bfb;"
| 79
| April 5
| Houston
| 
| Irving (42)
| Drummond (11)
| Durant (7)
| Barclays Center17,768
| 41–38
|- style="background:#bfb;"
| 80
| April 6
| @ New York
| 
| Durant (32)
| Durant (10)
| Durant (11)
| Madison Square Garden19,812
| 42–38
|- style="background:#bfb;"
| 81
| April 8
| Cleveland
| 
| Durant (36)
| Drummond (12)
| Brown, Irving (8)
| Barclays Center18,169
| 43–38
|- style="background:#bfb;"
| 82
| April 10
| Indiana
| 
| Irving (35)
| Drummond (13)
| Durant (16)
| Barclays Center17,967
| 44–38

Play-in

|- style="background:#bfb;"
| 1
| April 12
| Cleveland
| 
| Irving (34)
| Brown, Claxton (9)
| Irving (12)
| Barclays Center17,732
| 1–0

Playoffs

|- style="background:#fbb;"
| 1
| April 17
| @ Boston
| 
| Irving (39)
| Claxton (8)
| Curry, Irving (6)
| TD Garden19,156
| 0–1
|- style="background:#fbb;"
| 2
| April 20
| @ Boston
| 
| Durant (27)
| Brown, Irving (8)
| Durant (5)
| TD Garden19,156
| 0–2
|- style="background:#fbb;"
| 3
| April 23
| Boston
| 
| Brown (26)
| Brown, Durant (8)
| Irving (9)
| Barclays Center18,175
| 0–3
|- style="background:#fbb;"
| 4
| April 25
| Boston
| 
| Durant (39)
| Dragić (8)
| Durant (9)
| Barclays Center18,099
| 0–4

Player statistics

Regular season statistics
As of April 10, 2022

|-
| style="text-align:left;"| || 47 || 12 || 22.3 || .550 || .304 || .873 || 5.5 || .9 || .3 || 1.0 || 12.9
|-
| style="text-align:left;"| || 48 || 20 || 19.8 || .568 || .417 || .600 || 3.2 || 1.3 || 1.0 || .5 || 5.8
|-
| style="text-align:left;"| || 72 || 45 || 24.6 || .506 || .404 || .758 || 4.8 || 2.1 || 1.1 || .7 || 9.0
|-
| style="text-align:left;"| || 46 || 1 || 12.0 || .333 || .331 || .700 || 1.5 || 1.0 || .3 || .2 || 3.6
|-
| style="text-align:left;"| || 47 || 19 || 20.7 || .674 ||  || .581 || 5.6 || .9 || .5 || 1.1 || 8.7
|-
| style="text-align:left;"| || 19 || 19 || 29.9 || .493 || .468 || .857 || 2.6 || 2.6 || .9 || .2 || 14.9
|-
| style="text-align:left;"| || 16 || 6 || 25.5 || .376 || .245 || .739 || 3.2 || 4.8 || .9 || .2 || 7.3
|-
| style="text-align:left;"| || 24 || 24 || 22.3 || .610 || .000 || .537 || 10.3 || 1.4 || .9 || 1.0 || 11.8
|-
| style="text-align:left;"| || 22 || 7 || 15.5 || .361 || .243 || .810 || 3.0 || .8 || .6 || .3 || 4.7
|-
| style="text-align:left;"| || 55 || 55 || 37.2 || .518 || .383 || .910 || 7.4 || 6.4 || .9 || .9 || 29.9
|-
| style="text-align:left;"| || 48 || 23 || 20.6 || .412 || .353 || .842 || 3.6 || .6 || .6 || .5 || 5.9
|-
| style="text-align:left;"| || 2 || 0 || 7.0 || .286 || .500 ||  || 2.5 || .0 || .5 || .5 || 2.5
|-
| style="text-align:left;"| || 1 || 0 || 1.0 ||  ||  ||  || 1.0 || .0 || .0 || .0 || .0
|-
| style="text-align:left;"| || 4 || 0 || 14.5 || .385 || .250 ||  || 2.0 || 1.3 || .0 || .0 || 3.0
|-
| style="text-align:left;"| || 56 || 24 || 17.1 || .425 || .262 || .724 || 4.1 || 1.9 || .5 || .3 || 6.4
|-
| style="text-align:left;"| || 44 || 44 || 37.0 || .414 || .332 || .869 || 8.0 || 10.2 || 1.3 || .7 || 22.5
|-
| style="text-align:left;"| || 14 || 14 || 30.2 || .452 || .466 || .833 || 4.0 || 1.0 || .5 || .1 || 11.3
|-
| style="text-align:left;"| || 2 || 0 || 11.5 || .333 || .000 ||  || 2.0 || 1.5 || .5 || .5 || 2.0
|-
| style="text-align:left;"| || 29 || 29 || 37.6 || .469 || .418 || .915 || 4.4 || 5.8 || 1.4 || .6 || 27.4
|-
| style="text-align:left;"| || 62 || 10 || 19.2 || .469 || .271 || .527 || 3.5 || 2.1 || .5 || .5 || 5.5
|-
| style="text-align:left;"| || 81 || 48 || 29.0 || .408 || .400 || .814 || 1.9 || 2.3 || .6 || .2 || 11.4
|-
| style="text-align:left;"| || 24 || 0 || 11.3 || .376 || .222 || .706 || 3.7 || 1.0 || .2 || .5 || 3.4
|-
| style="text-align:left;"| || 32 || 8 || 12.2 || .577 || .286 || .585 || 5.0 || .5 || .3 || .5 || 6.2
|-
| style="text-align:left;"| || 67 || 2 || 17.6 || .433 || .270 || .829 || 2.4 || 1.2 || .5 || .1 || 8.5

Playoff statistics
As of April 25, 2022

|-
| style="text-align:left;"| || 4 || 4 || 34.8 || .568 || .429 || .800 || 4.8 || 2.8 || 1.3 || .8 || 14.0
|-
| style="text-align:left;"| || 4 || 0 || 24.5 || .792 ||  || .182 || 6.3 || 1.5 || 1.3 || 2.3 || 10.5
|-
| style="text-align:left;"| || 4 || 4 || 33.0 || .564 || .522 || .667 || 2.5 || 3.0 || .3 || .8 || 14.5
|-
| style="text-align:left;"| || 4 || 0 || 19.8 || .563 || .333 || 1.000 || 4.5 || 1.5 || .8 || .0 || 10.5
|-
| style="text-align:left;"| || 4 || 4 || 15.0 || .545 ||  || .600 || 3.0 || .8 || 1.3 || .8 || 3.8
|-
| style="text-align:left;"| || 4 || 4 || 44.0 || .386 || .333 || .895 || 5.8 || 6.3 || 1.0 || .3 || 26.3
|-
| style="text-align:left;"| || 2 || 0 || 3.5 ||  ||  ||  || .0 || .5 || .5 || .0 || .0
|-
| style="text-align:left;"| || 2 || 0 || 12.5 || .286 || .400 || 1.000 || 2.0 || 2.0 || .5 || .5 || 4.0
|-
| style="text-align:left;"| || 4 || 4 || 42.5 || .444 || .381 || 1.000 || 5.3 || 5.3 || 1.8 || 1.3 || 21.3
|-
| style="text-align:left;"| || 4 || 0 || 18.0 || .563 || .538 ||  || 1.0 || .0 || .0 || .3 || 6.3
|-
| style="text-align:left;"| || 1 || 0 || 0.4 ||  ||  ||  || .0 || .0 || .0 || .0 || .0
|-
| style="text-align:left;"| || 1 || 0 || 0.4 ||  ||  ||  || .0 || .0 || .0 || .0 || .0

Transactions

Trades

Additions

Subtractions

References

External links
 2021–22 Brooklyn Nets at Basketball-Reference.com

Brooklyn Nets
Brooklyn Nets seasons
Brooklyn Nets
Brooklyn Nets
2020s in Brooklyn
Prospect Heights, Brooklyn
Events in Brooklyn, New York